Sara dar dah daghigh-eh (2007) (translation: Sara in Ten Minutes) is an Iranian short documentary film co-produced and directed by Sadaf Foroughi.

Plot
In search of happiness, Sara immerses herself in her imagination. She is a fourteen-year-old girl who has lived in an orphanage since birth. She doesn't know anything about her past or her real identity. The film shows the extract of the colorful images from her dreams.

External links
 Watch Sara dar dah daghigh-eh online at Green Unplugged Online Film Festival
 Sara dar dah daghigh-eh at Clermont-Ferrand Short Film Festival 

2007 films
Iranian short documentary films
2007 short documentary films
2000s Persian-language films